Tobrilus longus is a nematode species from the family Tobrilidae, which lives in freshwater. The scientific name of the species was first validly published in 1851 by Joseph Leidy.

References

Enoplia